Guerrilla B.V. (trade name: Guerrilla Games) is a Dutch first-party video game developer based in Amsterdam and part of PlayStation Studios. The company was founded as Lost Boys Games in January 2000 through the merger of three smaller development studios as a subsidiary of multimedia conglomerate company Lost Boys. Lost Boys Games became independent the following year and was acquired by Media Republic in 2003, renaming the studio to Guerrilla Games before being purchased by Sony Interactive Entertainment in 2005. As of June 2021, the company employs 360 people under the leadership of joint studio heads Angie Smets, Jan-Bart van Beek, and Michiel van der Leeuw. It is best known for the Killzone and Horizon game series.

History 
Guerrilla is the result of a merger between three Dutch video game studios: Orange Games, Digital Infinity, and Formula Game Development. Orange Games was founded in 1993 by Arjan Brussee, the co-designer of the 1994 game Jazz Jackrabbit; Digital Infinity was founded by Arnout van der Kamp in 1995; and Formula was founded by Martin de Ronde in 1998 and sold to Lost Boys (a multimedia conglomerate company owned by Michiel Mol) in 1999. The three studios merged, forming Lost Boys Games as a subsidiary of Lost Boys on 1 January 2000. With de Ronde as managing director, the new company employed 25 people, growing to 40 by November 2000. Hermen Hulst was hired from a consulting firm to replace de Ronde as managing director the following year. In 2001, when Lost Boys merged with Swedish media company IconMediaLab, Lost Boys Games was spun off into an independent entity, though under the continued ownership of Mol.

Lost Boys Games began developing Game Boy Color games with original characters, but the studio found that publishers would rather release games including licensed characters. Because the studio did not want to compromise on significantly altering the characters it had created, it was unable to find a publisher for them. Consequently, Lost Boys Games moved on to work-for-hire projects, creating four handheld games: Dizzy's Candy Quest (Game Boy Color, 2001), Rhino Rumble (Game Boy Color, 2002), Black Belt Challenge (Game Boy Advance, 2002), and Invader (Game Boy Advance, 2002). The latter two games were published by Xicat Interactive. Mol later established a new media company, Media Republic, which acquired 75% of Lost Boys Games in 2003. Shortly thereafter, in July 2003, Lost Boys Games was renamed Guerrilla to reflect the style of its new parent company.

The developer soon began work on its two titles: Killzone (in development for Sony Computer Entertainment for the PlayStation 2) and Shellshock: Nam '67 (in development for Eidos Interactive for the PlayStation 2, Xbox and Microsoft Windows). Both titles would be released the following year to mixed reception, however Killzone enjoyed pre-release hype and anticipation, and despite some backfire effect due to the media hype, Killzone went on to sell over a million copies worldwide, earning Greatest Hits and Platinum status in North America and Europe respectively. Guerrilla signed an exclusive development agreement with Sony Computer Entertainment in March 2004, that would see future development solely for Sony's line of video game consoles, the PlayStation 2, PlayStation Portable and PlayStation 3.

By late 2005, many companies, like Eidos Interactive, eyed purchasing Guerrilla; ultimately, Sony Computer Entertainment bought out the entirety of Guerrilla in December 2005. Guerrilla went on to release Killzone: Liberation for the PlayStation Portable in October 2006, Killzone 2 for the PlayStation 3 in February 2009, and Killzone 3 for the PlayStation 3 in February 2011.

By February 2012, co-founder Brussee had left the studio to join Visceral Games. As of June 2018, Guerrilla employs 250 people in its Amsterdam offices; it planned to move into a new building on Nieuwezijds Voorburgwal in early 2019 and expand to at least 400 employees in this new location. In November 2019, Hulst was appointed the head of Worldwide Studios and Angie Smets, Jan-Bart van Beek and Michiel van der Leeuw became joint studio heads in his place.

During the 2015 E3 conference, Guerrilla unveiled a new intellectual property, Horizon Zero Dawn described as a "post-apocalyptic open world action role-playing game that follows the story of Aloy, a young huntress who inhabits a world that is overrun by machines, and attempts to journey across several lands to uncover her past."

In 2017, Guerrilla released Horizon Zero Dawn on the PlayStation 4. The game received widespread positive acclaim from various critics. An expansion, The Frozen Wilds, was released in November 2017. By February 2018, over 7.6 million copies had been sold, increasing to over 10 million a year later, making it one of the best-selling PlayStation 4 games. In March 2020, Hermen Hulst confirmed in an interview that Horizon Zero Dawn would receive a PC port. The PC version was released on 7 August 2020.

The next game in development, Horizon Forbidden West, was first revealed at the 2020 PS5 Future of Gaming event on 11 June 2020. It is a sequel to Horizon Zero Dawn. The game released on 18 February 2022. In August 2020, Guerrilla Games moved into their new studio space. On 4 January 2022, Guerilla and Firesprite revealed that a new Horizon game is in the works for PlayStation VR2 titled Horizon Call of the Mountain. In December 2022, Sony announced that an expansion for Horizon Forbidden West named Burning Shores will be releasing on 19 April 2023 on the PlayStation 5.

Games developed

As Lost Boys Games

As Guerrilla Games

Technology 

Guerrilla uses a proprietary game engine now known as Decima. The Decima engine is also used by other developers, such as Kojima Productions who use it for the Death Stranding series.

References

External links 
 

 
Dutch companies established in 2000
Companies based in Amsterdam
First-party video game developers
PlayStation Studios
2003 mergers and acquisitions
2005 mergers and acquisitions
Video game companies established in 2000
Video game companies of the Netherlands
Video game development companies